Unión is a neighbourhood of Montevideo, Uruguay.

Location
Unión shares borders with Mercado Modelo and Villa Española to the northwest, Maroñas to the northeast, Malvín Norte to the east, Buceo and Parque Batlle to the south and La Blanqueada and Larrañaga to the southwest.

History
Its history started in 1845, during General Oribe's siege of Montevideo, which at the time was little more than the actual Ciudad Vieja, by the creation of the Tribunal of Unión in the area. In 1849, Oribe founded here a village called "Restauración". After the end of the civil war, its status was elevated from "Pueblo" (village) to "Villa" (town) and was renamed to "Villa de la Unión" by Decree of 11 November 1851.

Educational facilities
 Colegio y Liceo Santa Luisa de Marillac (private, established 1919 by the Vicentian Sisters, lay since 1993)

Places of worship
 Sanctuary of the Miraculous Medal and St. Augustine, popularly known as "Iglesia de la Unión" (Roman Catholic, Congregation of the Mission)
 Parish Church of Our Lady of Mt. Carmel and St. Cajetan (Roman Catholic)
 Parish Church of St. Joseph the Worker (Roman Catholic)

Bibliography

See also 
Barrios of Montevideo

References

External links 

 Intendencia de Montevideo / Historia de Unión
 Revista Raices / Historia del barrio Unión
 Correo Uruguayo Stamp for the 150 years from the foundation of Villa de la Restauración, including notes on the history of Unión by Rubens D. Calabria.

 
Barrios of Montevideo